Yaña Ätnä is a rural locality (a derevnya) in Ätnä District, Tatarstan. The population was 338 as of 2015.

Geography 
 is located 1 km northeast of Olı Ätnä, district's administrative centre, and 80 km north of Qazan, republic's capital, by road.

History 
The village was established in 1990s. Its name derives from the word yaña (new) and the oecnonym Ätnä.

References

External links 
 

Rural localities in Atninsky District